Tentkheta (Tanetkheta) was the Great Royal Wife of Amasis II. She dates to the Twenty-sixth Dynasty of Egypt.

Biography
Tentkheta was one of the wives known for Pharaoh Amasis II. She was a daughter of a priest of Ptah named Padineith. She was the mother of a King's son named Khnum-ib-Re and the mother of Pharaoh Psamtik III. Tentkheta held the titles king's wife (hmt nswt) and overseer of the affairs of the acacia house (khrp seshmtiw shendjet).

References

6th-century BC Egyptian women
Queens consort of the Twenty-sixth Dynasty of Egypt
6th-century BC Egyptian people